Israel–Romania relations are foreign relations between Israel and Romania. Both countries established full diplomatic relations on June 11, 1948. Israel has an embassy in Bucharest. Romania has an embassy in Tel Aviv and a general consulate in Haifa, and 2 honorary consulates (in Jerusalem and Tel Aviv). The two countries have signed many bilateral treaties and agreements and both countries are full members of the Union for the Mediterranean.

History
During the Cold War, Romania was the only communist country not to break its diplomatic relations with Israel. The two countries signed a trade agreement on 30 January 1971 during Israeli Minister of Agriculture visit to Bucharest. In 1984, the Romanian minister of tourism visited Israel. The Romanian foreign minister Ioan Totu arrived in January 1988 accompanied by his department director, Mielcioiu. The minister of foreign trade and international cooperation, Ioan Unger came with a Romanian delegation in October 1988. Nicolae Ceaușescu's emissaries were sent for talks with Israeli leaders, though the head of state himself did not pay an official visit, claiming he would only do so when the Arab-Israeli conflict was resolved.

In an article in the Israel Journal for Foreign Affairs, Ambassador Avi Millo described how, during his posting (1996-2001), he hosted many dignitaries including the then prime minister, Professor Radu Vasile, at his residence in Bucharest. He served traditional Jewish cuisine to his Romanian guests and used it to teach them about Israeli culture. These meals, he stressed, facilitated conversation, trust, and enhanced the relationship between Israel and Romania.

In 2010, Israeli President Shimon Peres visited Romania and met with several Romanian leaders, among them President Traian Basescu, Senate leader Mircea Geoana and House Speaker Roberta Anastase. They discussed cooperation in the areas of defense, technology, education, business and tourism, and signed two agreements.

In 2014, Romanian Prime Minister Victor Ponta arrived in Israel and met with Israeli President Shimon Peres and Israeli Prime Minister Benjamin Netanyahu.

In March 2016, Romanian President Klaus Werner Iohannis arrived in Israel and met with Israeli President Reuven Rivlin, Knesset Speaker Yuli Edelstein, and other officials. They discussed terrorism, and Holocaust remembrance.

In April 2018, Romania announced that they would move their embassy in Israel to Jerusalem.

See also
 Foreign relations of Israel
 Foreign relations of Romania
 History of the Jews in Romania
 Emigration of Jews from Romania

References

 Romanian consulate general in Haifa

External links
  Israeli embassy in Bucharest
  Romanian embassy in Tel Aviv
  Romanian consulate general in Haifa

 
Romania
Bilateral relations of Romania